Elisabeth Görgl (born 20 February 1981) is a retired World Cup alpine ski racer from Austria.

Born in Bruck an der Mur, Styria, Görgl made her World Cup debut in March 2000 and has reached World Cup podiums in all five alpine disciplines, with multiple victories in giant slalom, Super-G, and downhill. In January 2008, she won her first World Cup race in the giant slalom at Maribor, Slovenia.

At the 2009 World Championships at Val d'Isère, Görgl won a bronze medal in super combined. In 2011 at Garmisch-Partenkirchen, she won two gold medals, the first in the Super-G and a second in the downhill five days later. Her sweep of the two women's speed events marked the third consecutive occurrence at the World Championships – preceded by Lindsey Vonn in 2009 at Val d'Isere and Anja Pärson in 2007 at Åre.

At the 2010 Winter Olympics, Görgl won the bronze medal in the downhill – the same medal in the same event as her mother half a century earlier at the 1960 and the 1964 Winter Olympics. A week later she also won bronze in the giant slalom. Görgl also participated in 4 disciplines in the 2014 Winter Olympics (Downhill, Giant slalom, Super-G, combined).

On 12 June 2017 she announced her retirement from active skiing. Her last race was a Super-G in Aspen in March the same year.

Personal
Görgl is the daughter of Traudl Hecher (b. 1943), an alpine racer for Austria in the early 1960s. She won Olympic bronze medals in the downhill in 1960 (at age 16) and 1964, and remains the youngest Olympic medalist in alpine skiing. Görgl's older brother Stephan (b. 1978) is a former World Cup alpine racer; he competed in the giant slalom at the 2006 Winter Olympics.

World Cup results

Season standings
 Ranking and points

Race victories
 7 wins – (2 DH, 3 SG, 2 GS) 
 42 podiums – (14 DH, 6 SG, 15 GS, 3 SL, 1 PS, 3 SC)

World championships

Winter Olympics

References

External links
 
 Elisabeth Görgl World Cup standings at the International Ski Federation
 
  – 
 Austrian Ski team – official site – Elisabeth Görgl – 
 Head Skis – teams – Elisabeth Görgl

1981 births
Living people
People from Bruck an der Mur
Olympic alpine skiers of Austria
Alpine skiers at the 2006 Winter Olympics
Alpine skiers at the 2010 Winter Olympics
Olympic bronze medalists for Austria
Olympic medalists in alpine skiing
Austrian female alpine skiers
Medalists at the 2010 Winter Olympics
Alpine skiers at the 2014 Winter Olympics
Sportspeople from Styria
20th-century Austrian women
21st-century Austrian women